Ceritaenia is a genus of moths belonging to the family Tortricidae.

Species
 Ceritaenia ceria Razowski & Becker, 2000

See also
 List of Tortricidae genera

References

External links
 tortricidae.com

Archipini
Tortricidae genera
Taxa named by Józef Razowski